Silas Bowker (April 26, 1769 Concord, Middlesex County, Massachusetts – October 14, 1834 Locke, Cayuga County, New York) was an American politician from New York.

Life
He was the son of Silas Bowker (1739–1789) and Esther (Hobbs) Bowker (1739–1824). He married Amy Harding (1769–1843), and they had six children.  His father Silas Bowker, was a revolutionary spy, who disguised as a Native American was captured by the British and was taken to Canada, where he escaped. 

He was a member of the New York State Assembly (Cayuga Co.) in 1814 and 1814–15.

He was a member of the New York State Senate (7th D.) in 1823; and again of the State Assembly (Cayuga Co.) in 1824.

He was buried at a cemetery in Locke, known as the Bowker Family or the Abbott Farm Cemetery.

Sources
The New York Civil List compiled by Franklin Benjamin Hough (pages 125, 139, 188f and 200; Weed, Parsons and Co., 1858)

External links

1769 births
1834 deaths
People from Concord, Massachusetts
People from Cayuga County, New York
New York (state) state senators
Members of the New York State Assembly
New York (state) Democratic-Republicans